Kenji Nanri (Nanri Kenji, born 8 June 1992) is a Japanese sailor. He competed in the Laser event at the 2020 Summer Olympics.

References

External links
 
 

1992 births
Living people
Japanese male sailors (sport)
Olympic sailors of Japan
Sailors at the 2020 Summer Olympics – Laser
Place of birth missing (living people)